The Color EP is the second extended play by Chandler Roberts. She released the EP on February 26, 2016. Chandler worked with Seth Penn, in the production of this EP.

Critical reception

Awarding the EP three and a half stars from New Release Today, Kaitlyn Gosnell states, "The Color EP fuses heartfelt and vulnerable lyrics with unforgettable musical soundscapes to create a wonderful worship experience that showcases CCM at its finest." Jonathan Andre, giving the EP four and a half stars at 365 Days of Inspiring Media, writes, "Heartfelt and emotional, comforting and enjoyable; this is a must-have for anyone who loves pop/worship music, and anyone who loves anything different and unique as compared to songs overplayed on the radio recently."

Track listing

References

2016 EPs